Issouf Sanou (born January 18, 1979 in Ouagadougou) is a footballer from Burkina Faso, who plays for Etoile Filante Ouagadougou.

Career 
Sanou began his career with ASFA Yennega and joined 2004 to Raja Casablanca. After just two years in Morocco turned back to Burkina Faso and signed with Etoile Filante Ouagadougou in summer 2006.

References

External links
 

1979 births
Living people
Burkinabé footballers
Burkina Faso international footballers
Expatriate footballers in Morocco
Étoile Filante de Ouagadougou players
ASFA Yennenga players
Sportspeople from Ouagadougou
Association football forwards
21st-century Burkinabé people